Cooke & Kelvey was founded in 1858 by Robert Thomas Cooke and Charles Kelvey. They were Kolkata-based clock-makers, silversmiths, jewelers working during the later period of British India. Notable Cooke and Kelvey clocks include those in the Salar Jung Museum in Hyderabad, the Bhim Chandra Nag sweet shop in Kolkata, and the Fairlie Warehouse in Kolkata. They remain silversmiths with showrooms in New Delhi and Raipur. They are the first and oldest appointed Rolex retailers in India, since 1946.

History 
Cooke & Kelvey are Victorian era silversmiths and their craft and designs have come from England. C&K's expertise and history of fine watchmaking eventually led to an association with Rolex of Geneva. By the 1880s, the company was hiring ‘native’ craftsmen in Calcutta and training them under British silversmiths. Currently, their silverware is produced in Kolkata by these eighteen families of craftsmen.

Cooke & Kelvey, Pearl & Diamond Merchants, Jewellers, Gold and Silver Art Workers held a leading position in the pre-independence British era. They were appointed Jewelers to the Earl of Mayo and received this favour of appointment from every succeeding Governor-General and Viceroy in those days. They had beautifully appointed showrooms with rare jewels of immense value, collected from all parts of the world. Their display of solid silver, testimonial plate, electroplate, clocks, watches, etc were unrivaled. Among the interesting articles which have been designed and manufactured by this firm are jeweled crowns, swords, belts, silver bedsteads, howdahs, state chairs, challenge cups, shields, address caskets, all of which have been manufactured for some notable occasion, and special mention must be made of the caskets presented to his Majesty King Edward, when, as Prince of Wales, he visited Calcutta in 1875, and then as King Emperor in December 1905.

Tower clocks were also a specialty of this firm, and many fine examples of this work have been made and erected in various parts of India. Being contractors to (Her Majesty's) Government they were large manufacturers of station and office clocks. Racing chronograph and complicated watches were also a leading feature of their business. The chronograph watches used by the Calcutta Turf Club for timing all important races have been supplied by this firm for many years. Between the 1920s and 1970s some of the classiest models from Rolex were retailed and serviced in Calcutta, Delhi and Lahore (till 1948), by Cooke & Kelvey.

In 1927, the firm was formed into a limited liability company. The then managing director was Mr. W. Gordon Deeks, Messrs. E. Bibra and W. Bruce Davidson. The firm had branches at Delhi, Simla and Lahore. The company was helmed by seven successive owners before passing onto the Khemka family in 1946.

References

Clock brands
Watch manufacturing companies of India